The year 681 BC was a year of the pre-Julian Roman calendar. In the Roman Empire, it was known as year 73 Ab urbe condita . The denomination 681 BC for this year has been used since the early medieval period, when the Anno Domini calendar era became the prevalent method in Europe for naming years.

Events

By place

Middle East 
 King Sennacherib of Assyria is assassinated by one or two of his sons in the temple of the god Ninurta at Kalhu (Northern Mesopotamia) after a 24-year reign in which he defeated the Babylonians, made Nineveh (modern Iraq) a showplace, and diverted the waters of the Tigris River into a huge aqueduct to supply  the city with irrigation.
 Sennacherib's second wife, Naqi'a (Zakitu), uses her wiles and influences to have the imperial council appoint her son Esarhaddon as her husband's successor in preference to the young man's two older brothers, who flee to Urartu (Armenia). Esarhaddon, unlike his father, is friendly toward Babylon and orders her reconstruction.

Asia 
 Xi of Zhou  becomes king of the Zhou Dynasty (China).

Births

Deaths 
 Sennacherib, king of Assyria

References